Stephen Kerho (born March 24, 1964) is a Canadian hurdler. He competed in the men's 110 metres hurdles at the 1988 Summer Olympics.

References

External links
 
 

1964 births
Living people
Athletes (track and field) at the 1988 Summer Olympics
Canadian male hurdlers
Olympic track and field athletes of Canada
World Athletics Championships athletes for Canada
Track and field athletes from Buffalo, New York